Elio Festa (born 10 October 1960) is an Italian former professional racing cyclist. He rode in one edition of the Tour de France and three editions of the Giro d'Italia.

References

External links
 

1960 births
Living people
Italian male cyclists
Cyclists from Emilia-Romagna